On average, between 1980 and 1994, a US bank failed every three days. The pace of bankruptcies peaked immediately after the 2008 financial crisis.
The 2007–2008 financial crisis led to many bank failures in the United States. The Federal Deposit Insurance Corporation (FDIC) closed 465 failed banks from 2008 to 2012. In contrast, in the five years prior to 2008, only 10 banks failed. At the end of 2022, the US banking industry had a total of about $620 billion in unrealized losses as a result of investments weakened by rising interest rates.

A bank failure is the closing of a bank by a federal or state banking regulatory agency. The FDIC is named as receiver for a bank's assets when its capital levels are too low, or it cannot meet obligations the next day. After a bank's assets are placed into receivership, the FDIC acts in two capacities—first, it pays insurance to the depositors, up to the deposit insurance limit, for assets not sold to another bank. Second, as the receiver of the failed bank, it assumes the task of selling and collecting the assets of the failed bank and settling its debts, including claims for deposits in excess of the insured limit. The FDIC insures up to $250,000 per depositor, per insured bank, as a result of the Emergency Economic Stabilization Act of 2008, which raised the limit from $100,000.

The receivership of Washington Mutual Bank by federal regulators on September 26, 2008, was the largest bank failure in U.S. history. Regulators simultaneously brokered the sale of most of the banks's assets to JPMorgan Chase, which planned to write down the value of Washington Mutual's loans at least $31 billion.

2008
Twenty-five (twenty-six including the Utah-based wholly owned subsidiary of Washington Mutual, which was covered under the same FDIC closure notice as its parent company) banks failed in 2008

2009
One hundred forty banks failed in 2009

2010
One hundred fifty-seven banks failed in 2010

2011
Ninety-two banks failed in 2011

2012
Fifty-one banks failed in 2012

2013
Twenty-four banks failed in 2013

2014
Eighteen banks failed in 2014

2015
Eight banks failed in 2015

2016
Five banks failed in 2016

2017
Eight banks failed in 2017

2018
No banks failed in 2018.

2019
Four banks failed in 2019

2020
Four banks failed in 2020

2021
No banks failed in 2021.

2022
No banks failed in 2022.

2023

So far, two banks failed in 2023 (per FDIC). A third bank, Silvergate Bank, voluntarily wound down operations and liquidated.

See also

 List of banks acquired or bankrupted during the Great Recession for a list of US banks and non-US banks
 List of largest U.S. bank failures
 Too big to fail
 March 2023 United States bank failures

Notes

External links
 Failed US banks since October 2000. FDIC.

 List of bank failures in the United States

United States economic history-related lists
Lists of banks in the United States